Andreas Niederer (born 22 August 1967) was a Swiss footballer who played in the 1990s as goalkeeper.

Club career 
Niederer joined FC Basel's first team from local amateur club FC Allschwil. He signed in as reserve goalkeeper during their 1994–95 season under head-coach Claude Andrey because first choice keeper Stefan Huber was injured.

After playing in one test game Niederer played his domestic league debut for the club in the away game on 13 May 1995 as Basel won 1–0 against Lausanne-Sport. He kept a clean sheet not only in this game, but also in his next match one week later.

In his half year with the club Niederer played a total of 5 games for Basel. Four of these games were in the Nationalliga A and the other was the friendly game against RC Strasbourg.

References

Sources
 Die ersten 125 Jahre. Publisher: Josef Zindel im Friedrich Reinhardt Verlag, Basel. 
 Verein "Basler Fussballarchiv" Homepage

FC Basel players
Swiss men's footballers
Association football goalkeepers
Swiss Super League players
1967 births
Living people